Maciej Drzewicki (22 February 1467 – 22 August 1535) was the archbishop of Gniezno and primate of Poland in 1531. He was born in Drzewica, and was a humanist. Prior to becoming archbishop, he was bishop of Włocławek in 1513 and bishop of Przemyśl in 1503.

Drzewicki began his career as a canon of Kraków in 1488. He was Krakow scholastic and secretary of the chancellery royal in 1492, and became first secretary in 1497. He was the Sandomierz cantor in 1493 and the Łęczyca scholastic in 1496. He was provost of Skalbmier in 1498 and provost at St. Florian in Kraków in 1499. He was a canon at Poznań in 1500.

Drzewicki was a Crown vice-chancellor in 1501 and became grand chancellor of the Crown in 1511. He was a royal commissioner in Gdańsk in 1524. He died in Łowicz.

References

External links
List of Primates of Poland 
Henryk Rybus: Prymas Maciej Drzewicki: zarys biografii (1467-1535).

1467 births
1535 deaths
Archbishops of Gniezno
Roman Catholic bishops of Przemyśl
Canons of Kraków
People from Opoczno County
Crown Vice-Chancellors